The State Academy of Fine Arts Karlsruhe is an art school located in Karlsruhe, Baden-Württemberg, Germany.

History 
The Academy was founded in 1854 by Frederick I, Grand Duke of Baden, with the landscape painter Johann Wilhelm Schirmer as the first director. Today it is led by artist Ernst Caramelle, and, with an average of 300 students, is one of the smaller German art schools. The Academy is split between three buildings in Karlsruhe, including Scheibenhardt castle.

Curriculum at the Academy includes Fine Art,  (sculpture, painting, graphic, and video), but also become a teacher at a German high-school (German:  Gymnasium).

Notable students and professors
 Erwin Aichele (1887–1974)
 Horst Antes (* 1936)
 Georg Baselitz (* 1938)
 Hermann Billing (1867–1946)
 Sonia Delaunay (1885–1979)
 Wilhelm Hempfing (1886–1948)
Friedrich Heyser (1857–1921)
 Karl Hubbuch (1891–1979)
 Alexander Kanoldt (1881–1939)
 Per Kirkeby (* 1938)
 Max Laeuger (1864–1952)
 Markus Lüpertz (* 1941)
 Georg Scholz (1890–1945)
 Emil Schumacher (1912–1999)
 Klaus Theweleit (* 1942)
 Herbert Wetterauer (* 1957)
 Hans Thoma (1839–1924)

Literature 
 Axel Heil, Harald Klingelhöller (Editors): 150 Years. The History of the Academy of Fine Arts Karlsruhe in Pictures. Die Geschichte der Kunstakademie Karlsruhe in Bildern und Texten. Swiridoff, 2004. ISBN 3-89929-045-3
 Vereinigung der Freunde der Kunstakademie Karlsruhe e.V. (Hrsg.): Festschrift zum 125-jährigen Bestehen. C.F.Müller Verlag GmbH, Karlsruhe 1979.

See also
The State Academy of Fine Arts Karlsruhe at German Wikipedia

References

External links 
 Homepage of the State Academy of Fine Arts Karlsruhe

Universities and colleges in Karlsruhe
Art schools in Germany
Educational institutions established in 1854
1854 establishments in Germany